Sverre Jensen (22 January 1893 – 26 October 1963) was a Norwegian football player. He was born in Kristiania. He played for the club Ready, and also for the Norwegian national team. He competed at the 1912 Summer Olympics in Stockholm.

References

External links

1893 births
1963 deaths
Footballers from Oslo
Norwegian footballers
Norway international footballers
Footballers at the 1912 Summer Olympics
Olympic footballers of Norway
Association football midfielders